Tumaco is a port city and municipality in the Nariño Department, Colombia, by the Pacific Ocean. It is located on the southwestern corner of Colombia, near the border with Ecuador, and experiences a hot tropical climate. Tumaco is inhabited mainly by Afro-Colombians and some indigenous people.

Tumaco is accessible by plane from Pasto, the capital city of Nariño Department, as well from Cali and Bogotá. It can also be reached by land via highway from Pasto and   San Lorenzo (Ecuador).  Tumaco is known for being the hometown of many great Colombian soccer players, including Willington Ortiz.

Colombian film director Samuel Córdoba released a documentary about the city in 2009. The film, entitled "Tumaco Pacífico", chronicles the stilt-house area of the city, predominantly populated by Afro-Colombians. Córdoba was inspired by a panoramic photo of the stilt houses he saw in a photography book on Tumaco. The film won first place at the Festival de Cine Latinoamericano de Bordeaux, in France, and was presented at the Festival Internacional de Cine, in Santiago, Chile.

Other places of interest include ecotourism sites and beaches located near the mouth of the Mira River, where the river meets the sea. Also, there are the Playas de Milagros (beaches of Miracles), and Bocananueva y Teran beaches, where visitors can experience the diversity of flora and fauna first-hand.

Image Gallery

Climate
The wettest months are from January to June, and there is a rainfall trough in August opposite to northern Colombia.

Economy
Tumaco's location on the coast provides it with a number of maritime-related economic activities. One of the main lines of the region's economy is artisanal fishing. Shrimp farming is one of its strengths.

In recent years there has been a development in agricultural holdings; Crops present in the area, such as African palm, dry rice, and cocoa have become mechanised. Other crops of pancoger (small plots of peasant families) are the main source of food for their population.

The cultivation of cocoa is widely used among the peasant population; Tagua is also cultivated, known as ivory nut or vegetable ivory, it is the seed of the Phytelephas macrocarpa palm and its production, although in decline in the municipality, is still high.

Another product is the African palm (Elaeis guineensis) and the commercial cultivation of crude palm oil. There are about  planted with African palm and 7 oil extraction plants, representing an important source of job creation for the region.

Tourism has gained important places in the economy of the municipality, the beaches of El Morro, Bocagrande and El Bajito every day attract national and foreign visitors. Tumaco is also the main Colombian oil port on the Pacific Ocean, and the second nationwide, after Coveñas. In recent years, the pipeline and the port have served to transport and export Ecuadorian oil, a situation that is reflected in the movement of its foreign trade.

Transportation
La Florida Airport serves Tumaco with flights from Cali.

Tumaco is the site of Colombia's second most important Pacific port behind Buenaventura. Due to the limited development of roads in the region, the port is the primary way of accessing several villages along the coast.

Impact of the armed conflict
Tumaco was highly affected by the Colombian armed conflict as recently as 2011. On 17 August 2011, four soldiers from the Colombian army were killed in Tumaco by FARC-EP guerrillas from the 29th front. On 29 August 2011 five more soldiers were killed by guerrillas in the outskirts of the city, A few weeks earlier, guerrillas from the Western Bloc of the FARC-EP stormed the local prison, freeing roughly fifteen imprisoned FARC members.

On 26 September, seven people, including a local politician, were killed by unidentified gunmen in the inner city. The perpetrators also kidnapped one politician. Apart from the FARC-EP, the area was the home turf of paramilitary groups like the right-wing Los Rastrojos and the Guevarist, left-wing Ejército de Liberación Nacional. Consequently, Tumaco is bound to benefit greatly from the recent peace treaty with the FARC.

See also
 1979 Tumaco earthquake

References

External links
 Tumaco: Tourist guide
 Tumaco: Web Portal San Andres de Tumaco - La Perla Del Pacifico

Port cities in Colombia
Municipalities of Nariño Department